Miss Trot is a South Korean reality television show. It was aired on TV Chosun every Thursday starting from February 28 and ended on June 1, 2019.

The show had a male version spin-off, Mr Trot, premiered on January 2, 2020.

The second season of Miss Trot premiered on December 17, 2020 and ended on March 3, 2021.

Synopsis 
Miss Trot is a trot audition program where 100 female contestants compete. The winner wins a prize money and also a chance to record a single. In every episode, twelve music masters act as judges.

Changes in Running Time

Main Host

Season 1 and 2 
 Kim Sung-joo

Masters

Season 1 
 Jang Yoon-jeong
 Noh Sa-yeon
 
 
 Park Myeong-su
 Jang Young-ran
 Shin Ji
 Kim Jong-min
 Boom
 Woohyun (INFINITE)
 Kim So-hee
 
 Christian Burgos

Season 2 
 Jang Yoon-jeong
 
 
 Shin Ji
 Boom
 Kim Jun-su
 Jang Yong-ran
 
 Son Jun-ho
 Lim Young-woong
 Jang Minho
 Young Tak
 Lee Chan-won
 
 
 Kim Young-ok

Contestants

Season 1

Season 2

Episodes

Season 1

Episodes 1-3: Introduction and 100-Contestant Master Audition 
Each contestant performs in front of a panel of 12 judges. Each judge is able to award the contestant a "heart", signified by lighting up a heart-shaped display next to their chair. If a contestant receives hearts from all 12 judges, she automatically advances in the competition. After all members in a group have performed, the judges deliberate, and decide if there are any contestants who did not receive 12 hearts who should still advance in the competition. All aired auditions are listed in the table below.

Bold = Contestant received all 12 hearts and advanced to the next round.

Italic = Contestant did not receive all 12 hearts, but was selected by the judges to advance to the next round.

Underline = Contestant's audition was not aired in full during the episode.

Episodes 4-5: Death Match Mission 1: Group Mission 

  – Team Received 7 Hearts
All Member's from team received 7 Hearts Advanced to Next Round
 (*) Contestant chosen by the master to advance the next round (chosen after team performance)
 (**) Contestant chosen by the master to advance the next round (chosen after ALL team perform)

Episode 5-6: Death Match Mission 2: 1 VS 1 

  – Contestant won.
  – Contestant lost.

 Number of heart is received from 11 masters
 winning contestant automatically goes to next round, and losing contestant became "elimination candidate"
 *losing contestants chosen by the master to advance the next round

Episode 6-8: 3rd Mission 
1st Round Group Match

2nd Round Group Match

Episode 8-9: Semi-Finals Missions 
1st Round Individual Match

2nd Round 1 VS 1

Hearts Received From Masters but not affect total score

  – Contestants advances to FINAL MISSIONS

Episode 10: Final Missions 
1st Round: Composer Mission

2nd Round: My Life Song Mission

Season 2

Episodes 1-3: Introduction and 121-Contestant Master Audition 
Each contestant performs in front of a panel of 17 judges. Each judge is able to award the contestant a "heart", signified by lighting up a heart-shaped display next to their chair.

If contestant received 15 hearts, they will automatically proceed to next round. In addition, if contestant received 9 to 14 hearts, they will be given a pass only. However, if contestant received less than 9 heart, they will be out immediately.

Ratings

Season 1

Season 2

Notes

References

External links 
 Season 1 Official Website 
 Season 2 Official Website 

South Korean music television shows
Music competitions in South Korea
Korean-language television shows
2019 South Korean television series debuts
South Korean reality television series
2021 South Korean television series endings
Trot television series